Three-time defending champion Rafael Nadal defeated Novak Djokovic in the final, 6–0, 6–2, 7–5 to win the men's singles tennis title at the 2020 French Open. It was his record-extending 13th French Open title and 20th major title overall, equaling Roger Federer's all-time record of men's singles titles. For the fourth time in his career, Nadal won the title without dropping a set during the tournament; for the first time in French Open history, neither the men's nor women's singles champions lost a set. Nadal also became the first player, male or female, to win 100 matches at the French Open and only the second man, after Federer at the Australian Open and Wimbledon, to win 100 matches at the same major. Djokovic was attempting to become the first man in the Open Era to achieve the double career Grand Slam (a feat he would accomplish at the following year's tournament).

Lorenzo Giustino defeated Corentin Moutet 0–6, 7–6(9–7), 7–6(7–3), 2–6, 18–16 in the first round. The match was the second-longest in French Open history, lasting 6 hours and 5 minutes, and the fourth-longest in major history. Taylor Fritz and Lorenzo Sonego played the longest tie-break in French Open history: Sonego won the third set tie-break 19–17 to win their third-round match 7–6(7–5), 6–3, 7–6(19–17).

Jannik Sinner became the first man to reach the quarterfinals of Roland Garros on debut since Nadal in 2005 and the youngest quarterfinalist since Djokovic in 2006. He also became the first man born in the 21st century to reach a major quarterfinal.

Seeds
All seedings per ATP rankings.

Draw

Finals

Top half

Section 1

Section 2

Section 3

Section 4

Bottom half

Section 5

Section 6

Section 7

Section 8

Other entry information

Wild cards

Protected ranking

Qualifiers

Lucky losers

Withdrawals

References

External links
2020 French Open – Men's draws and results at the International Tennis Federation

Men's Singles
French Open by year – Men's singles
French Open - Men's Singles